New Hampshire elected its members August 26, 1816.

See also 
 1816 and 1817 United States House of Representatives elections
 List of United States representatives from New Hampshire

Notes 

1816
New Hampshire
United States House of Representatives